Jurswailly Luciano (born 25 March 1991) is a Dutch handball player, who plays for Metz Handball and the Netherlands national team.

International honours
EHF Cup:
Finalist: 2013

Individual awards
 All-Star Right Wing of the Championnat de France: 2017

References

External links

1991 births
Living people
Dutch female handball players
People from Willemstad
Dutch expatriate sportspeople in France
Expatriate handball players
Handball players at the 2016 Summer Olympics
Olympic handball players of the Netherlands
Dutch people of Curaçao descent
21st-century Dutch women